Laurence H. Kedes (July 19, 1937 – January 6, 2021) was an American scientist in the fields of gene expression, genomics, and cellular differentiation. His first faculty position was at Stanford University (1970-1989), where he was promoted to full professor in the Department of Medicine and focused on basic molecular biology and gene expression. In 1988, the University of Southern California (USC) recruited Kedes to spearhead a campus-wide initiative to strengthen their molecular biology and genetics research programs. At USC, Kedes conceived and developed the Institute of Genetic Medicine, becoming its founding director (1989-2008) as well as the William Keck Professor (1988-2009) and Chair (1988-2002) of the Department of Biochemistry and Molecular Biology.

Education
Kedes attended Weaver High School in Hartford, Connecticut, and then earned his BS in biology from Stanford University in 1961 after completing 3 years (1957-1959) of undergraduate studies at Wesleyan University, which later recognized him as a Distinguished Alumnus, awarding him an honorary bachelor's of arts degree (2009). Kedes earned his medical degree from Stanford University Medical School (1958-1962) and then completed his internship and junior year of residency in internal medicine at the University of Pittsburgh (1962-1964), followed by two years of research at the Laboratory of Biochemistry and Biology Branch, within the National Cancer Institute (1964-1966). Following a senior residency year at the Brigham and Women's Hospital, Kedes joined the laboratory of Paul R. Gross at the Massachusetts Institute of Technology, completing his postdoctoral research fellowship. Supported by a Leukemia Society award, he then worked for one year (1969-1970) in Europe, most notably with embryologist, Alberto Monroy, and molecular biologist Max Birnstiel.

Career
Kedes was recruited by Stanford University (1970-1989), where he was promoted to the rank of full professor and became the institution's first investigator supported by the Howard Hughes Medical Institute (1974-1982). While at Stanford, he founded IntelliGenetics (later IntelliCorp) (1980-1987), the first company focused on designing and applying computer programs, expert systems, and artificial intelligence for the analysis of DNA sequences. There, Kedes held the positions of Senior Scientist and Chairman. 

In 1989, Kedes moved to University of Southern California (USC) where he conceptualized, obtained extramural funding for, and oversaw the design and building of the Institute of Genetic Medicine (IGM). The institute followed a collaborative model and Kedes recruited 20 faculty to the IGM during his tenure as its founding director. He also served as Scientific Director and Co-Chair of the Scientific Advisory Board for the Archon X PRIZE in Genomics (2005-2013) and was the Weston Visiting Professor at the Weitzmann Institute (2009). 

Following his retirement from USC, Kedes served as Interim Director of Medical Genetics at Cedars Sinai Medical Center (2012-2014). 

Kedes authored over 220 papers, reviews, and book chapters. His published work has over 23,000 citations with two papers receiving over 1000 citations each and over 45 receiving over 100 citations each, as of 2016.

Awards and honors
John Simon Guggenheim Foundation Fellow
Howard Hughes Medical Institute Investigator
Member, American Society for Clinical Investigation 
Provosts Gold Medal from the University of Messina (Italy)
Henry N. Neufeld Memorial Award (Israel)
University of Southern California Distinguished Faculty Service Award (2004)
Scientific Director of the X PRIZE Foundation

Research and scientific contributions
Kedes was an internationally recognized expert in the field of skeletal muscle and cardiac muscle molecular genetics with scientific contributions to molecular biology and gene expression that spanned over four decades. Among his scientific achievements was the first isolation of a protein-coding gene from an animal cell, and he was the first to determine the DNA sequence of a protein coding animal gene. His initial research focused on understanding the chromosomal arrangement, sequences, and regulation of the multi-gene family encoding histone proteins, which later proved to play a central role in controlling overall gene expression, including the formation of eu- and heterochromatin (see histone code). The second phase of his research concerned the regulation of actin genes, another multi-gene family. During this period, Kedes recognized evolutionary conserved elements within non-coding regions of the 3' ends of mRNAs, and predicted that these regions were likely targets of post-transcriptional regulation, which later proved to be correct (see, for example, microRNA, AU-rich element, three prime untranslated region). In the third phase of his research, Kedes turned his attention to muscle gene expression and myocyte differentiation and transdifferentiation, including early forays into cardiac gene therapy. He was also a developer of the first federally funded digital web-based database for storing and analyzing DNA sequences, laying the foundation, along with the Los Alamos National Laboratory, for the development of subsequent NIH databases, including GenBank at the NCBI. Seeing the need to develop sophisticated expert systems to analyze increasingly complex sets of DNA databases, Kedes initiated collaborations with fellow Stanford University molecular biologist Douglas Brutlag and computer scientists Peter Friedland and Edward Feigenbaum and sought and obtained federal funding to establish a pre-internet era resource to share openly both the DNA sequence data and the mainframe computer aided analysis software in a program that they named Bionet. These four faculty, together, formed Intelligenetics, which was the first entity that managed Bionet.

Personal life
The son of Rosalyn and Samuel Kedes, Larry Kedes was born in Hartford, Connecticut. He married Shirley Beck in 1958. They had three children, Dean Kedes (born 1960), Maureen Kedes (born 1962), and Todd Kedes (born 1966).  He had a younger sister, Judith Kedes (1941 – 2016).

Death 
On January 6, 2021, Laurence died peacefully at age 83, following a period of declining health.

References

1937 births
2021 deaths
Howard Hughes Medical Investigators
American molecular biologists
Keck School of Medicine of USC faculty
Stanford University alumni
Stanford University faculty
American geneticists